Sangla Hill is a tehsil in the Nankana Sahib District of the Punjab Province of Pakistan. It lies 103 km from the provincial capital of Lahore and 47 km from Faisalabad. Until 2005, it was part of Sheikhupura District.

Education

Colleges
 Government Islamia Graduate College Sangla Hill
 Jinnah Polytechnic Institute
 Fauji foundation college
  Govt college of Technology

Schools
 Dar-e-Arqam Schools
 White Rose School System
 St. Anthony's High School

Notable persons
 Hameed Nizami
 Chaudhry Muhammad Barjees Tahir

References 
2. Municipal Committee Sangla Hill

Populated places in Nankana Sahib District
Tehsils of Punjab, Pakistan
Nankana Sahib District
2005 establishments in Pakistan